Sons and Daughters may refer to:

Television 
 Sons and Daughters (Australian TV series), a 1982–87 soap opera
 Sons & Daughters (2006 TV series), a U.S. sitcom
 Sons and Daughters (1974 TV series), a U.S. drama series starring Gary Frank and Glynnis O'Connor
 Sons and Daughters (1991 TV series), a U.S. series starring Lucie Arnaz
 "Sons and Daughters" (Star Trek: Deep Space Nine), an episode of Star Trek: Deep Space Nine

Other uses
 Sons and Daughters (1971 film), a Taiwanese film directed by Yueh Feng
 Sons and Daughters (film), a 2001 Argentine film directed by Marco Bechis
 Sons and Daughters (band), a Scottish rock band
 "Sons & Daughters", a song by The Decemberists from The Crane Wife
 Sons & Daughters (restaurant), a San Francisco restaurant

See also
 
 "Son and Daughter", a 1973 song by Queen
 Daughters and Sons, a 1937 novel by Ivy Compton-Burnett